"God Gave Me Everything" was the fourth track and single from English singer-songwriter Mick Jagger's fourth solo album, Goddess in the Doorway. Rolling Stone called it "a driving, riff-propelled rocker that evokes the punkish stomp of the early Stones." The single peaked at number 24 on Billboard Mainstream Rock Tracks chart and was rated 3 out of 5 stars by AllMusic.

Chart performance

References

External links 
 "God Gave Me Everything" on Discogs

2001 songs
2001 singles
Mick Jagger songs
Songs written by Mick Jagger
Song recordings produced by Mick Jagger
Song recordings produced by Lenny Kravitz
Music videos directed by Mark Romanek